Fukushima Galilei (until 2019, Fukushima Industries) is a Japanese manufacturer of commercial refrigeration equipment; particularly for the food industry, but since 1999 also for medical applications. It was founded in 1951 by Nobuo Fukushima in Osaka, where  it is still based. In 1994, it went public; and since 2002, it has been listed on the Tokyo Stock Exchange. It has offices throughout Japan and also in many parts of Asia, including China, Hong Kong, Malaysia, Singapore and Taiwan.

In 2013, it gained brief notoriety outside its usual areas of operation when it introduced as corporate mascot a cartoon anthropomorphic egg with the unfortunately-chosen name Fukuppy; a name which it quickly withdrew.

References

External links
 
 

Japanese companies established in 1951
Manufacturing companies based in Osaka
Engineering companies of Japan
Companies listed on the Tokyo Stock Exchange
1994 initial public offerings